The 1951 World Table Tennis Championships mixed doubles was the 18th edition of the mixed doubles championship.  

Bohumil Váňa and Angelica Rozeanu defeated Vilim Harangozo and Ermelinde Wertl in the final by three sets to nil.

Results

See also
List of World Table Tennis Championships medalists

References

-